Louis Joseph Halle Jr. (17 November 1910, New York City – 13 August 1998, Geneva, Switzerland) was an American naturalist, author, U.S. State Department official, and professor of international studies in Geneva.

Halle received his bachelor's degree from Harvard University in 1932.

He served in the US Army before World War II and in the Coast Guard during World War II. He was a Latin American specialist employed by the US State Department Policy Planning Staff from the mid 1940s to 1954. From 1954 to 1956 at the University of Virginia, he was a researcher on American foreign policy. He became in 1956 a professor at the Graduate Institute of International Studies in Geneva. He retired there as professor emeritus in 1973 but remained in Geneva.

He was the author of 22 books. In 1941 he received the John Burroughs Medal for Birds Against Men.

Family
Louis J. Halle Jr. married Barbara Mark in 1946 and was the father of five children.  The famous inventor and philanthropist Hiram Halle was a brother of Louis J. Halle, Sr. and an uncle of Louis J. Halle Jr.

Selected publications

References

1910 births
1998 deaths
Harvard University alumni
Academic staff of the Graduate Institute of International and Development Studies
20th-century American Jews
American foreign policy writers
American naturalists
American non-fiction environmental writers
American political writers
John Burroughs Medal recipients
American nature writers
American male non-fiction writers
20th-century naturalists